"Trouble" is the lead single from Cypress Hill's sixth studio album, Stoned Raiders. The song was the first part of the double A-Side single it shared with "Lowrider" in Europe. "Lowrider" was not released until February elsewhere.

Music video
The song's music video begins with a shot of B-Real sitting in his car trying make a call on his cellphone. After his phone dies, he exits the vehicle to use a payphone. Having no change, B-Real places a $100 bill in a cup belonging to a person sleeping on the streets and takes a quarter out of the cup. He tries to make a call on the pay but discovers the phone line has been cut. As he turns around, he sees a group of hooded people start to form around him. B-Real's car then begins to drive. The previously sleeping person has left behind their money cup (and sign) suggesting they are the person driving away in B-Real's car. The hooded mob begin a foot chase and B-Real begins to run. 

Meanwhile, Sen Dog is sitting at home drinking a beer on the couch. As he goes to the fridge to get another he hears a knock at the front door. After opening the door he sees a brawl in the front yard. Leaving the door open, he slowly walks out to his porch pausing for a beat before jumping into the brawl. His family exits the house to find that he is actually by himself, looking on in confusion. 

The video returns to B-Real who is still running through the streets. He turns down an alley and his trapped. As the hooded mob finally catch up to him they remove their hoods and reveal that they are actually all different versions of B-Real himself. 

Shots of the band performing the song are inter-cut with the video's story.

Track listing
Trouble/Lowrider double a-side track listing:

Charts

Personnel
 B-Real – Vocals
 Sen Dog – Vocals
 DJ Muggs – Mixing
 Eric Bobo – Drums
 Rogelio Lozano – Guitar
 Christian Olde Wolbers – Bass

Notes

A  "Lowrider" and "Trouble" were released together as a double A-side single in several European territories.

References

Cypress Hill songs
Columbia Records singles
2001 singles
2001 songs
Songs written by DJ Muggs
Songs written by B-Real
Songs written by Sen Dog
Song recordings produced by DJ Muggs